Golushjerd (also Romanized as Golūshjerd, Golūshejerd, Galooshjerd, and Galūshjerd; also known as Gol Shekū, Golūshījer, Gulshegar, Gulshigard, and Kolūshjerd) is a village in Haram Rud-e Olya Rural District, in the Central District of Malayer County, Hamadan Province, Iran. At the 2006 census, its population was 177, in 35 families.

References 

Populated places in Malayer County